Guam competed in the 2009 East Asian Games which were held in Hong Kong, China from December 5, 2009 to December 13, 2009. Guam won a Bronze medal in Taekwondo.

Medal list

Bronze
 Gilbert Anthony Carbullido Pascua Dec 7 2009 Taekwondo -62 kg Men

See also
 Guam at the Olympics

References

https://web.archive.org/web/20091213011734/http://results.2009eastasiangames.hk/en/Root.mvc/MedalCountry/GUM

2009 East Asian Games
Sports in Guam
2009 in Guamanian sports
Guam at the East Asian Games